Fintan is an Irish given name. In Irish mythology, Fintan mac Bóchra is said to be the sole survivor of the Great Flood on the island of Ireland, subsequently becoming a personification of old age and knowledge. As a shapeshifter, he appears to be identical to the Salmon of Wisdom and the name may thus have deeper roots in Celtic mythology. The mythical figure is probably the source for the use of the name in medieval and modern times.

As an acronym, Fintan also stands for 

 the Flexible Integrated Transformation and Annotation Engineering platform, a tool for the language resource transformation that aims to facilitate knowledge extraction and knowledge integration tasks in language technology and its applications. The name alludes to both the aspects of transformation (shapeshifting) and knowledge (wisdom) associated with Fintan mac Bóchra.

Notable persons and characters with this name include:

 mythological
 Fintan mac Bóchra, figure in Irish mythology
 Ireland and Scotland, medieval
Fintan of Clonenagh, 6th- and 7th-century Irish saint
Saint Fintan Munnu, 7th-century Irish saint, a disciple of Saint Columba
 Findanus,  9th- and 10th-century chief on the Isle of Skye, Scotland
 Fintan of Rheinau (Findan, Findanus), 9th c. catholic saint and hermit, born in Leinster, active in Rheinau, Switzerland
Ireland, modern
James Fintan Lalor, (1807–1849) an Irish revolutionary
Fintan O'Toole (born 1958), Irish columnist, writer, literary editor and drama critic
Fintan Kilbride (1927–2006), Irish priest
Fintan McAllister, Irish cricketer
Fintan Connolly, Irish film-maker
Fintan Coogan Snr (1910–1985), Irish Fine Gael politician
Fintan Coogan Jnr, Irish Fine Gael politician
Fintan Cullen, Irish writer and academic
Fintan Walsh, Irish Gaelic football player
Fintan Warfield, Irish Sinn Féin politician
Great Britain, modern
Fintan Ryan, British scriptwriter
Switzerland
Fintan of Rheinau (Findan, Findanus), 9th c. catholic saint and hermit, born in Leinster, active in Rheinau, Switzerland
Fintan Birchler, 18th c. priest in Rheinau, Switzerland, author of a vita of Fintan of Rheinau
Fintan Mundwiler, 19th-century Swiss Benedictine

Fictional characters
 Fintan Pyren, an unstable villainous murderer in the book series Keeper of The Lost Cities by Shannon Messenger

References

Acronyms
Irish-language masculine given names